Nutanhat is a village in Mongalkote CD block in Katwa subdivision of Purba Bardhaman district in the state of West Bengal, India.

Geography

Physical features
The Kunur, one of the main tributaries of the Ajay, joins the Ajay near Nutanhat.

CD block HQ
The headquarters of Mongalkote CD block are located at Nutanhat.

Urbanisation
88.44% of the population of Katwa subdivision live in the rural areas. Only 11.56% of the population live in the urban areas. The map alongside presents some of the notable locations in the subdivision. All places marked in the map are linked in the larger full screen map.

Demographics
As per the 2011 Census of India Nutanhat had a total population of 5,349, of which 2,738 (51%) were males and 2,611 (49%) were females. Population below 6 years was 587. The total number of literates in Nutanhat was 3,328 (69.89% of the population over 6 years).

Transport
The State Highway 7, running from Rajgram (in Murshidabad district) to Midnapore in (Paschim Medinipur district), passes through Nutanhat.

Culture

Binoy Ghosh mentions that in the mosque belonging to the Hussain Shah era at Nutanhat there is a stone tablet in which there is mention of a king Sri Chandra Sen, whose identity is not clear.

Healthcare
Singot Rural Hospital at Singot, PO Mathrun (with 50 beds) is the main medical facility in Mongalkote CD block. Mongalkote CD block primary health centre at Nutanhat functions with 15 beds. There are primary health centres at Chanakkasem, PO Kasem Nagar (with 6 beds), Khirogram (with 2 beds), Lakhoria (with 10 beds) and Nigon (with 6 beds).In 2012, the average monthly patients attending Mongalkote BPHC were 8,795 and average monthly admissions were 373. It handled 484 annual emergency admissions.

See also - Healthcare in West Bengal

References

Villages in Purba Bardhaman district